My Experiences in the Third World War by Michael Moorcock was an anthology published by Savoy Books in 1980.

Contents
The short stories: 
Going to Canada, 
Leaving Pasadena, and 
Crossing into Cambodia 
concern the adventures of a Russian KGB agent. It takes place in an alternate historical timeline during an apocalyptic world war in which the United States and the Soviet Union are allies.

The three stories were supposed to be chapters of a commissioned larger book (to be called Reminiscences of the Third World War) rather than an anthology. However Savoy Books had been convicted the year before in High Court for selling bootleg records imported from America. The fines and penalties prohibited the cash-strapped publisher from going forward with the project.

The rest of the book was filled up with other material:
 The Dodgem Division was a previously published Jerry Cornelius short story.
 The Adventures of Jerry Cornelius: The English Assassin were extracts of a Jerry Cornelius comic strip co-written by Moorcock and M. John Harrison and drawn by Mal Dean and R. Glyn Jones. It was originally serialized in the International Times from June 1969 (Issue #57, pg.8) to January 1970 (Issue #71, pg.25).

The final three stories were written by Moorcock under his pen name of "James Colvin". Peace on Earth was co-written with Barrington J. Bayley (under his pen name of "Michael Barrington").
Peace on Earth, the story where "two spacefarers [search] for an answer to the fathomless ennui caused by their immortality". 
The Lovebeast,: in the story, deadly fallout from years of orbital nuclear testing by the world's governments is slowly killing all life on Earth. The Lovebeast, a creature floating above the Earth that has stored Love within itself for millions of years, wishes to Love mankind. Dying artist Charlie Curtis may be the conduit by which the Lovebeast can connect to humanity. 
The Real Life Mr. Newman (AKA Adventures of the Dead Astronaut), is about a dying English astronaut who returns to an Earth whose cities have been changed to reflect the moral subconsciousness of their inhabitants.

Printings
The short story The Dodgem Division had first been printed in Speculation magazine (issue No.23; 1969).

The short story Crossing into Cambodia had previously been in the anthology Twenty Houses of the Zodiac by New English Library, Ltd. (NEL) in 1979. Going to Canada, Leaving Pasadena, and Crossing into Cambodia were later reprinted in The Opium General and other stories by Harrap in 1984. The short story Casablanca, the earliest story in the series, was first published in the later anthology Casablanca by Victor Gollancz Ltd. in 1989. All four stories were published together for the first time in the anthology Earl Aubec and Other Stories by Millennium in 1993 and White Wolf in 1999.

The Lovebeast (1957) and The Real Life Mr. Newman (1961) were first printed in The Deep Fix anthology (Compact Books 1966). The Deep Fix also reprinted the short stories The Deep Fix (Science Fantasy magazine No.64; 1963), Peace on Earth (New Worlds magazine Vol. 30 – No. 89; 1958), and The Pleasure Garden of Felipe Sagittarius (New Worlds magazine Vol.49 – No.154; 1965).

References

1980 British novels
Novels by Michael Moorcock
British science fiction novels